In mathematics, Euclid numbers are integers of the form , where pn # is the nth primorial, i.e. the product of the first n prime numbers. They are named after the ancient Greek mathematician Euclid, in connection with Euclid's theorem that there are infinitely many prime numbers.

Examples
For example, the first three primes are 2, 3, 5; their product is 30, and the corresponding Euclid number is 31.

The first few Euclid numbers are 3, 7, 31, 211, 2311, 30031, 510511, 9699691, 223092871, 6469693231, 200560490131, ... .

History
It is sometimes falsely stated that Euclid's celebrated proof of the infinitude of prime numbers relied on these numbers.  Euclid did not begin with the assumption that the set of all primes is finite.  Rather, he said: consider any finite set of primes (he did not assume that it contained only the first n primes, e.g. it could have been ) and reasoned from there to the conclusion that at least one prime exists that is not in that set.
Nevertheless, Euclid's argument, applied to the set of the first n primes, shows that the nth Euclid number has a prime factor that is not in this set.

Properties
Not all Euclid numbers are prime.
E6 = 13# + 1 = 30031 = 59 × 509 is the first composite Euclid number.

Every Euclid number is congruent to 3 modulo 4 since the primorial of which it is composed is twice the product of only odd primes and thus congruent to 2 modulo 4. This property implies that no Euclid number can be a square.

For all  the last digit of En is 1, since  is divisible by 2 and 5. In other words, since all primorial numbers greater than E2 have 2 and 5 as prime factors, they are divisible by 10, thus all En ≥ 3 + 1 have a final digit of 1.

Unsolved problems

It is not known whether there is an infinite number of prime Euclid numbers (primorial primes).
It is also unknown whether every Euclid number is a squarefree number.

Generalization
A Euclid number of the second kind (also called Kummer number) is an integer of the form En = pn # − 1, where pn # is the nth primorial. The first few such numbers are:
1, 5, 29, 209, 2309, 30029, 510509, 9699689, 223092869, 6469693229, 200560490129, ... 

As with the Euclid numbers, it is not known whether there are infinitely many prime Kummer numbers. The first of these numbers to be composite is 209.

See also 
 Euclid–Mullin sequence
 Proof of the infinitude of the primes (Euclid's theorem)

References

Integer sequences
Unsolved problems in number theory